Lisela may refer to:
the Lisela people
the Lisela language